was a Japanese reality game show based on the popular international Survivor format. The show broadcast on the Tokyo Broadcasting System on Tuesdays. Its hosts were Neptune as 'Presenter', and Munehiro Tokita, a voice actor, as 'Guide Staff'. Four seasons were broadcast from April 2002 to March 2003. As of December 2019, the Tokyo Broadcasting System has not yet announced plans for a fifth season.

The prize for Sole Survivors was  10,000,000 yen.

Format & Rules 

The show follows the same general format as the other editions of the show. 16 castaways are split between two teams and are taken to a remote isolated location and are forced to live off the land with meager supplies for 39 days. Frequent physical and mental challenges are used to pit the teams against each other for rewards, such as food or luxuries, or for "immunity", forcing the other tribe to attend "Tribal Council", where they must vote off one of their players.

Once about half the players are remaining, the tribes are merged into a single tribe, and competitions are on an individual basis; winning immunity prevents that player from being voted out. Most players that are voted out at this stage form the "Tribal Council Jury". Once down to two people, a final Tribal Council is held where the remaining players plead their case to the Jury as to why they should win the game. The jury then votes for which player should be considered the "Sole Survivor" and be awarded the grand prize of 10,000,000 yen.

Seasons

References

External links
 Official site (archive) 

TBS Television (Japan) original programming
Japan
Japanese game shows
2002 Japanese television series debuts
2003 Japanese television series endings